Commander John Simon Kerans   (30 June 191512 September 1985) was an officer in the Royal Navy and later a Conservative Party politician. He is also the author of the 1964 book The World's Greatest Sea Adventures, Publisher: Odhams Books Ltd.

The Yangtze Incident
As Assistant British Naval Attaché in then Nanking, China in 1949, Lieutenant-Commander Kerans took command of  when the ship came under fire on the Yangtze River during the final stages of the Chinese Civil War after the captain and 16 others were killed in the shelling. The ship was detained for ten weeks during negotiations for its release, until Kerans led a night-time escape. Kerans was awarded the Distinguished Service Order. The Amethyst incident was later the subject of a film entitled Yangtse Incident: The Story of HMS Amethyst (1957), in which Kerans was portrayed by the British actor Richard Todd.

Politics
At the 1959 general election he was elected as Conservative Member of Parliament for The Hartlepools. He served only one term in the House of Commons, and did not contest the 1964 general election. He advocated the representation of Communist China in the United Nations.

Kerans was the last Conservative to serve as MP for the constituency, (now called Hartlepool) until Jill Mortimer was elected following  the 2021 Hartlepool by-election.

Grave 
His remains are interred in the churchyard of St Peters, Tandridge and the grave can be found in the eastern side near the boundary wall.

References

External links 
 

1915 births
1985 deaths
Royal Navy officers
Royal Navy officers of World War II
Politics of the Borough of Hartlepool
Conservative Party (UK) MPs for English constituencies
UK MPs 1959–1964